Dante Gianello (26 March 1912, in Chiesa in Valmalenco, Italy – 12 November 1992, in Privas, France) was a professional road bicycle racer. Born with the Italian nationality, he changed to the French in 1931. His career ended when during the GP del Desembarcament del Sud, on 15 August 1945, he was hit by a jeep.

Major results

1935
Nice-Toulon-Nice
1938
Tour de France:
Winner stage 13
10th place overall classification
1939
Boucles de Sospel
1940
Circuit du Pays Grassois
1942
Coupe Marcel Vergeat St-Etienne
1943
GP des Alpes
1945
Circuit des villes d'eaux d'Auvergne

External links 

Official Tour de France results for Dante Gianello

French male cyclists
1912 births
1992 deaths
French Tour de France stage winners
Cyclists from the Province of Sondrio
Italian emigrants to France